Envelopes is an indie-pop band with members hailing from Sweden and France.

History 
Envelopes' debut album Demon (Swedish for The Demo or Demos) was released in the UK in August 2005 and in America in April 2006. The album was recorded at Henrik Orrling's family farm in Sweden, where the video for their single Sister in Love was also filmed. Demon also includes home recordings dating from 2001 to 2004.

Envelopes toured the UK in February 2004. They played at SXSW in 2006, and toured the US with Ratatat in September 2006.

August 2007 saw the band make a full album mixtape available as an mp3 on their website. Entitled 'Soup of Germs', the album features 11 Envelopes tracks spliced together with samples of their influences and favourite artists, such as The B-52's, Talking Heads and Pink Floyd. This mixtape album was also distributed for free at various gigs in CD format, along with the 'Soup of Germs' packaging.

Their second album, "Here Comes The Wind", was released in February 2008, on Brille Records.

Discography

Albums 
 Demon (2006) - Brille
 Here Comes The Wind (2008) - Brille

Singles and EPs 
 I Don't Like It (2004) - Rex Records
 Sister in Love (2005) - Brille
 Freejazz (2006) - Brille
 I Don't Even Know (LA Priest remix) - Brille
 Smoke In The Desert, Eating The Sand, Hide In The Grass (2007) - Brille
 Life on the Beach (2007) - Brille
 Party (2008) - Brille
 Put on Hold

External links 
 Official band web site
Contact Music's Envelopes page
 Brille Records
 

Swedish indie pop groups
English-language singers from Sweden